The 2003 county council election was held on Monday 15 September 2003 for all eighteen county councils in Norway. The election was held parallel to the municipal council election.

Votes

Seats

County mayors

Cabinets

References

See also
 County council
 Elections in Norway

2003
2003
Norway
County council election
Election 2003
September 2003 events in Europe